Robert John McIntosh (17 October 1921 – 22 December 2008) was an Australian rules footballer who played with St Kilda in the Victorian Football League (VFL).

McIntosh also served in World War II, representing Victoria in the Territory Forces football championship in 1944.

He later moved to Ararat and died in 2008.

Notes

External links 

1921 births
Australian military personnel of World War II
Australian rules footballers from Melbourne
St Kilda Football Club players
2008 deaths
Military personnel from Melbourne
People from Mordialloc, Victoria